Pristimantis lasalleorum is a species of frog in the family Strabomantidae.
It is endemic to Colombia.
Its natural habitat is tropical high-altitude grassland.

References

lasalleorum
Amphibians of the Andes
Amphibians of Colombia
Endemic fauna of Colombia
Taxonomy articles created by Polbot